II liiga is the fourth level of football league competition in Estonia arranged by the Estonian Football Association. It consists of 28 teams, divided geographically into two divisions with 14 teams respectively in group North/East and South/West. Until 2013, it was the third level league.

Competition
During the season, teams play each opponent twice, once at home and once away, for 26 matches. At the end of the season, the winners of both divisions face each other in one final match to determine the champion of II liiga. As in most countries with low temperatures in winter time, the season starts around April and lasts until around the start of November.

At the end of the season, the winners of both divisions may be promoted to the Esiliiga B. This is providing the clubs meet the licensing criteria of the Esiliiga B. Second placed clubs of the divisions face each other in a play-off, the winner of which will play with Esiliiga B eight placed (third bottom) club for promotion to the Esiliiga.

Two clubs from the bottom end of both divisions are relegated to the III liiga. Third bottom clubs in both divisions will play a playoff with winners of playoffs of III liiga second placed clubs.

II Liiga North/East

2019 season

2019 II N/E liiga consists of 14 teams. Nine of them remain the same, one was promoted from III liiga South, one from III liiga West and two were relegated from higher divisions. Promoted teams are Põhja-Tallinna JK Volta II and FC Jõgeva Wolves and relegated teams are Tartu FC Santos (from Esiliiga) and Lasnamäe FC Ajax (from Esiliiga B). Tallinna JK Legion II joined the league from II S/W liiga. These teams replaced Tartu FC Santos II and Maardu United (dissolved), Põhja-Tallinna JK Volta (promoted) as well as Raasiku FC Joker and Tallinna JK Piraaja  (transferred to II S/W liiga).

Clubs

The following clubs are competing in II liiga North/East during the 2019 season.

a – ineligible for promotion to Esiliiga B

Statistics

Winners

Bold teams were promoted

II Liiga South/West

2018 season

2018 II S/W Liiga consists of 14 different teams. Eight of them remain the same. Two were promoted from III Liiga West, one from III Liiga North and one from III Liiga East. They were Pärnu JK Poseidon, Läänemaa JK, JK Tallinna Kalev III and Paide Linnameeskond III. One team was transferred from II Liiga N/E. It was Tallinna JK Legion II. Remaining team was relegated from Esiliiga B, which was Viimsi JK. These teams replaced FC Nõmme United, Pärnu Jalgpalliklubi and FC Flora U19 (all promoted), Saue JK Laagri, SK Imavere and Viimsi JK II. Also Tallinna JK Dünamo changed its name to Tallinna JK Legion II.

Clubs

The following clubs were competing in II liiga South/West during the 2018 season.

a – never been relegated from II liiga 
b – never played in Esiliiga B/Esiliiga 
c – ineligible for promotion to Esiliiga B

Statistics

Winners

Bold teams were promoted

Promotion 
In addition to league winners, second placed teams also get a chance to get promoted. First of all, both second placed teams play each other and the winner goes to the second round, where it meets with Esiliiga B 8th placed team. The winner of this game gets to compete in Esiliiga B.

First round

Second round 

Notes
''Note 1: No promotion play-offs were played because FCI Tallinn and Tallinna FC Levadia merged and JK Sillamäe Kalev was relegated to II liiga because of financial difficulties.

II liiga finals
Every season II Liiga North/East and II Liiga South/West winners compete in a match. The winner is named the II liiga champion.

References

External links
II Liiga North/East
II Liiga South/West

4
Est
Estonian Football Championship